Click, Clack, Quackity-Quack: An Alphabetical Adventure is a children's picture book by Doreen Cronin. Published in 2005 by Atheneum Books, it is a sequel to Click, Clack, Moo: Cows That Type and was illustrated by Betsy Lewin. A sequel, Click, Clack, Splish, Splash: A Counting Adventure, followed in 2006.

Plot
The book has phrases that start with each letter of the alphabet. It tells the story of a Duck-led summer outing that includes the cows from Click, Clack, Moo: Cows That Type. When Duck rides his wagon, the readers go through the ABCs. The animals stop at a good place to have a picnic.

Reception
A Publishers Weekly review says, "Lewin's loose, thickly outlined watercolors keep readers in playful suspense along the way, dropping visual hints for eagle-eye observers. Her sunny depictions of this barnyard bunch brim with personality and humorous detail". A Kirkus Reviews review says, " Lewin's brush and watercolor illustrations are as loose and lively as ever, barely restrained by the A-to-Z format that juxtaposes a big lowercase letter with each visual vignette". A School Library Journal review says, "A delightfully daffy romp with kid appeal galore".

References

2005 children's books
American picture books
Children's fiction books
Alphabet books
Books about ducks
Atheneum Books books